This is a list of airlines that have an Air Operator Certificate issued by the Civil Aviation Authority of New Zealand.

Scheduled airlines

Charter airlines

Cargo airlines

See also 
List of defunct airlines of New Zealand
List of airlines
List of general aviation operators of New Zealand

References

External links
 

 
Airlines
New Zealand
Airlines
New Zealand